Insurance in Pakistan is regulated under the Insurance Ordinance, 2000. It is divided into three components: life insurance, general insurance and health insurance. The Government of Pakistan established the Department of Insurance in April 1948 as a department of the Ministry of Commerce; the aim of this department is to take care of affairs related to the insurance industry. Out of the 54% that Pakistan's service sector contributes to the national GDP, insurance, along with transport, storage, communications and finance occupy 24% of the sector.

The insurance industry in Pakistan is relatively small compared to its peers in the region.  The insurance penetration and density remained very modest as compared to other jurisdictions while the insurance sector remained underdeveloped relative to its potential.
The Pakistani insurance market has undergone major structural changes in last few years through mergers of companies to meet the increased statutory requirement of minimum paid up capital as per Insurance Ordinance 2000. Some companies who were unable to raise this capital have been asked to close down their operations. The Security and Exchange Commission of Pakistan (SECP), Insurance Division, is trying to improve the image of Pakistan Insurance Industry by issuing directives on financial security and transparency, code of good governance and sound market practice.

Companies
List of notable insurance companies in Pakistan:

 State Life Insurance Corporation of Pakistan
 Jubilee Life
 ABC Life Policy
 EFU Life

References